Luc Mullinder (born September 25, 1980) is a former professional Canadian football defensive end who played for nine seasons in the Canadian Football League. Mullinder was originally drafted 31st overall by the Saskatchewan Roughriders in the 2004 CFL Draft and spent the first eight years of his career with the team. He has also played for the Montreal Alouettes and Hamilton Tiger-Cats. He attended Michigan State on a football scholarship.

Professional career
Mullinder was drafted in the fourth round, 31st overall, by the Saskatchewan Roughriders in the 2004 CFL Draft and would go on to play for eight seasons with the team. He won a Grey Cup championship with the team in 2007. He was traded to the Alouettes on August 8, 2011 for import receiver Dallas Baker and was released by the Alouettes on August 22, 2011. He was signed by the Hamilton Tiger-Cats on August 23, 2011 and released the following off-season on February 1, 2012. He was re-signed by the Alouettes on March 26, 2012. On April 30, 2013, Mullinder signed a one-day contract with Saskatchewan so that he could retire as a member of the Roughriders.

References 

1980 births
Living people
New Zealand emigrants to Canada
Michigan State Spartans football players
New Zealand players of Canadian football
Saskatchewan Roughriders players
Montreal Alouettes players
Hamilton Tiger-Cats players
Sportspeople from Auckland